The Netherlands returned at the Eurovision Song Contest at the Eurovision Song Contest 1992, after withdrawing from the 1991 contest.

Their entry was Humphrey Campbell with the song "Wijs me de weg" after he won the Dutch national final, Nationaal Songfestival 1992. At Eurovision, the song came ninth, having received 67 points.

Before Eurovision

Nationaal Songfestival 1992 
Nederlandse Omroep Stichting (NOS), the Dutch national broadcaster, continued to host a national final to select the Dutch entry for the Eurovision Song Contest 1992, held in Malmö, Sweden. Nationaal Songfestival 1992 was held at the NOS TV studios in Hilversum on 29 March 1992, hosted by Bas Westerweel. The winner was chosen by the votes of 12 regional juries, which was Humphrey Campbell with the song "Wijs me de weg", composed by Edwin Schimscheimer.

At Eurovision
Campbell performed 23rd (last) on the night of the contest, following Germany. "Wijs me de weg" came 9th of 23, receiving 67 points.

The Dutch conductor at the contest was Harry van Hoof.

Voting

References

External links
Dutch National Final 1992

1992
Countries in the Eurovision Song Contest 1992
Eurovision